Patreksfjörður Airport or Patreksfjordur Airport  was an airport serving Patreksfjörður, Iceland.

The Patreksfjordur non-directional beacon (Ident: PA) is located on the field.

The airport was closed in 2011 after having had no commercial flight service since 2000.

See also
Transport in Iceland
List of airports in Iceland

References

External links
OurAirports - Patreksfjörður
OpenStreetMap - Patreksfjörður

Airports in Iceland

Airports disestablished in 2011
Defunct airports